The 1923 Lincoln Lions football team was an American football team that represented Lincoln University in the Colored Intercollegiate Athletic Association (CIAA) during the 1923 college football season. In their first year under head coach Ulysses S. Young, the Lions compiled a 5–1–2 record and were recognized as the black college national co-champion along with Howard.

The championship game between Howard and Lincoln attracted 25,000 spectators, "the largest crowd in the history of colored football" to that time.

The team's players included quarterback Jazz Byrd, left halfback and team captain Robert Walter Johnson (nicknamed "Whirlwind), right halfback "Butts" Brown, fullback Lee, ends J. W. Lancaster and "Birdie" Crudup, tackles W. R. C. Coston and R. S. Jason, guards Poindexter and Parker, and center Chris "Big Boy" Morgan. Lincoln captured five of eleven first-team spots on the 1923 All-C.I.A.A. football team selected by committee of the Colored Intercollegiate Athletic Association. Lincoln's first-team honorees were Byrd at quarterback, R. W. Johnson at left halfback, Chris Morgan at center, and J. W. Lancaster in the line.

Schedule

Notes

References

Lincoln
Lincoln Lions football seasons
Black college football national champions
Lincoln Lions football